The Pulaski Presbyterian Church Complex is located in the Town of Pulaski, Wisconsin.

The Presbyterian church was built in 1874 to replace the previously used one. An affiliated schoolhouse was built on the site in 1901. The complex was added to the State Register of Historic Places in 2012 and to the National Register of Historic Places the following year.

The Schoolhouse Annex building, separated from the church building, may be considered a one-room schoolhouse.

References

Churches on the National Register of Historic Places in Wisconsin
School buildings on the National Register of Historic Places in Wisconsin
National Register of Historic Places in Iowa County, Wisconsin
Presbyterian churches in Wisconsin
Greek Revival church buildings in Wisconsin
Churches completed in 1874
Churches in Iowa County, Wisconsin
Christian schools in Wisconsin
Schools in Iowa County, Wisconsin
Defunct schools in Wisconsin
Vernacular architecture in Wisconsin
1874 establishments in Wisconsin
One-room schoolhouses in Wisconsin